Assara inouei is a species of snout moth in the genus Assara. It was described by Hiroshi Yamanaka in 1994 and is known from Japan, Korea and China.

The larvae feed on pomegranate.

References

External links
Larval and Pupal Morphology and Biological Characteristics of Assara inouei (Lepidoptera: Pyralidae)

Moths described in 1994
Phycitini
Moths of Asia